Amphicyanis is an extinct genus of terrestrial carnivores belonging to the suborder Caniformia, family Amphicyonidae ("bear dog"), and which inhabited Eurasia and North America.

Amphicyanis was named by Springhorn (1977). It was assigned to Amphicyonidae by Carroll (1988).

Sources

Bear dogs
Prehistoric mammals of North America
Prehistoric carnivoran genera